Adelstein (Jewish: Ashkenazic) is a Jewish surname meaning "precious stone".

In USA History 
In 1880 there were 5 Adelstein families living in Illinois. This was about 42% of all the recorded Adelstein's in the USA.

Notable people with the surname include:

 Abraham Manie Adelstein (1916–1992), South African medical statistician
 Garrett Adelstein (born 1986), American professional poker player
 Jake Adelstein, American journalist and writer
 Jonathan Adelstein, American Federal Communications Commissioner
 Marty Adelstein, American television producer
 Paul Adelstein (born 1969), American film actor
 Stan Adelstein (born 1931), American politician

References 

German-language surnames
Jewish surnames
Yiddish-language surnames